In signal processing, a root-raised-cosine filter (RRC), sometimes known as square-root-raised-cosine filter (SRRC), is frequently used as the transmit and receive filter in a digital communication system to perform matched filtering. This helps in minimizing intersymbol interference (ISI). The combined response of two such filters is that of the raised-cosine filter.  It obtains its name from the fact that its frequency response, is the square root of the frequency response of the raised-cosine filter, :

or:

Why it is required 
To have minimum ISI (Intersymbol interference), the overall response of transmit filter, channel response and receive filter has to satisfy Nyquist ISI criterion. The raised-cosine filter is the most popular filter response satisfying this criterion. Half of this filtering is done on the transmit side and half is done on the receive side. On the receive side, the channel response, if it can be accurately estimated, can also be taken into account so that the overall response is that of a raised-cosine filter.

Mathematical description 

	
The RRC filter is characterised by two values; β, the roll-off factor, and Ts the reciprocal of the symbol-rate.

The impulse response of such a filter can be given as:

,
though there are other forms as well.

Unlike the raised-cosine filter, the impulse response is not zero at the intervals of ±Ts. However, the combined transmit and receive filters form a raised-cosine filter which does have zero at the intervals of ±Ts. Only in the case of β=0 does the root raised-cosine have zeros at ±Ts.

References 

 S. Daumont, R. Basel, Y. Louet, "Root-Raised Cosine filter influences on PAPR distribution of single carrier signals", ISCCSP 2008, Malta, 12-14 March 2008.
 Proakis, J. (1995). Digital Communications (3rd ed.). McGraw-Hill Inc. .
Linear filters
Telecommunication theory